The MLS Next All-Star Game, formerly known as the MLS Homegrown Game, is an exhibition match between selected players in MLS Next Pro. Similar to events such as Major League Baseball's All-Star Futures Game, the National Hockey League's NHL All-Star Skills Competition and the National Basketball Association's Rising Stars Challenge, the event serves as a supporting event to the league's all-star game.

The inaugural game, held on August 4, 2014 against the Portland Timbers U23s at Providence Park, ended in a scoreless draw. The competition was held every season until 2020 when it was disrupted due to the COVID-19 pandemic. The competition resumed under its current name and format.

Results

MLS Homegrown Game (2014–2021)

MLS Next All-Star Game (2022–present)

Yearly rosters

2014

2015

2016

† – Herivaux was named as an injury replacement for Heath.

2017

† – Goslin, Hernández, and Palmer-Brown were named as injury replacements for Davies, Farfan, and Tabla.

2018

2019

References

External links
Official Site

Homegrown Game
Homegrown Game